The Last Unicorn is a fantasy novel  by American author Peter S. Beagle and published in 1968, by Viking Press in the U.S. and The Bodley Head in the U.K. It follows the tale of a unicorn, who believes she is the last of her kind in the world and undertakes a quest to discover what has happened to the other unicorns. It has sold more than six million copies worldwide since its original publication, and has been translated into at least twenty-five languages (prior to the 2007 edition).

In 1987, Locus ranked The Last Unicorn number five among the 33 "All-Time Best Fantasy Novels", based on a poll of subscribers; it ranked number eighteen in the 1998 rendition of the poll.

Plot
A group of human hunters pass through a forest in search of game. After days of coming up empty-handed, they begin to believe they are passing through a Unicorn's forest, where animals are kept safe by a magical aura. They resign themselves to hunting somewhere else; but, before they leave, one of the hunters calls out a warning to the Unicorn that she may be the last of her kind. This revelation disturbs the Unicorn, and though she initially dismisses it, eventually doubt and worry drive her to leave her forest. She travels through the land and discovers that humans no longer even recognize her; instead they see a pretty white mare. She encounters a talking butterfly who speaks in riddles and songs and initially dodges her questions about the other unicorns. Eventually, the butterfly issues a warning that her kind have been herded to a far away land by a creature known as the Red Bull. She continues to search for other unicorns. During her journey, she is taken captive by a traveling carnival led by the witch, Mommy Fortuna, who uses magical spells to create the illusion that regular animals are in fact creatures of myth and legend. The Unicorn finds herself the only true legendary creature among the group, save for the harpy, Celaeno. Schmendrick, a magician traveling with the carnival, sees the Unicorn for what she is, and he frees her in the middle of the night. The Unicorn frees the other creatures including Celaeno, who kills Mommy Fortuna and Rukh, her hunchbacked assistant.

The Unicorn and Schmendrick continue traveling in an attempt to reach the castle of King Haggard, where the Red Bull resides. When Schmendrick is captured by bandits, the Unicorn comes to his rescue and attracts the attention of Molly Grue, the bandit leader's wife. Together, the three continue their journey and arrive at Hagsgate, a town under Haggard's rule and the first one he had conquered when he claimed his kingdom. A resident of Hagsgate named Drinn informs them of a curse that stated that their town would continue to share in Haggard's fortune until such a time that someone from Hagsgate would bring Haggard's castle down. Drinn goes on to claim that he discovered a baby boy in the town's marketplace one night in winter. He knew that the child was the one the prophecy spoke of, but he left the baby where he found it, not wanting the prophecy to come true. King Haggard found the baby later that evening and adopted it.

Molly, Schmendrick and the Unicorn leave Hagsgate and continue toward Haggard's castle, but on their way they are attacked by the Red Bull. The Unicorn runs, but is unable to escape the bull. In an effort to aid her, Schmendrick unwittingly turns the Unicorn into a human woman. Confused by the change, the Red Bull gives up the pursuit and disappears. The change has disastrous consequences on the Unicorn, who suffers tremendous shock at the sudden feeling of mortality in her human body. Schmendrick tells the unicorn that he is immortal and that he cannot make real magic unless he is mortal, and encourages her to continue her quest. The three continue to Haggard's castle, where Schmendrick introduces the Unicorn as "Lady Amalthea" to throw off Haggard's suspicions. They manage to convince Haggard to allow them to serve him in his court, with the hopes of gathering clues as to the location of the other unicorns. During their stay, Amalthea is romanced by Haggard's adopted son, Prince Lír. Haggard eventually reveals to Amalthea that the unicorns are trapped in the sea for his own benefit, because the unicorns are the only things that make him happy. He then openly accuses Amalthea of coming to his kingdom to save the unicorns and says that he knows who she really is, but Amalthea has seemingly forgotten about her true nature and her desire to save the other unicorns.

Following clues given to them by a cat, Molly, Schmendrick, and Amalthea find the entrance to the Red Bull's lair. Haggard and his men-at-arms attempt to stop them, but they manage to enter the bull's lair and are joined by Lír. When the Red Bull attacks them, Schmendrick changes Amalthea back to her original form. At this moment, Schmendrick joyfully becomes mortal. In an effort to save the Unicorn, Lír jumps into the bull's path and is trampled. Fueled by anger and sorrow, the Unicorn drives the bull into the sea. The other unicorns are freed, and they run back to their homes, with Haggard's castle falling in their wake. As the castle falls, its wreckage dissolves into mist before it even hits the ground, and nothing remains to indicate that a castle had ever been there.

The Unicorn revives Lír with the healing touch of her horn. Now king after Haggard's death, he attempts to follow the Unicorn despite Schmendrick advising against it. As they pass through the now-ruined town of Hagsgate, they learn that Drinn is actually Lír's father, and that he had abandoned him in the marketplace on purpose to fulfill the prophecy. Realizing that he has new responsibilities as king after seeing the state of Hagsgate, Lír returns to rebuild it after accompanying Schmendrick and Molly to the outskirts of his kingdom. The Unicorn returns to her forest. She tells Schmendrick that she is different from all the other unicorns now, because she knows what it's like to feel love and regret. Schmendrick and Molly later come across a princess in trouble and he tells her to go to Lír because he is the hero to save her. Schmendrick and Molly leave this story into another as they sing a love song together.

Characters
The Unicorn is the protagonist of the story. She leaves the safety of her forest upon learning that she is the last unicorn in the world, with information about the Red Bull as her only clue. When she first encounters the Red Bull, Schmendrick manages to inadvertently change the Unicorn into a human female to confuse the Red Bull and force its withdrawal. Schmendrick calls her "Lady Amalthea" so as not to arouse King Haggard's suspicions. Beagle notes that he took the name "Amalthea" from a Greek deity with the same name.
The butterfly is an eccentric character who happens upon the Unicorn at the beginning of the story. While speaking in riddles and songs, he manages to give the Unicorn some vital information about the other unicorns' whereabouts. Beagle stated that the butterfly's dialogue is drawn from things that amused him and his childhood friend, Phil Sigunick, during a trip to Berkshire Hills where Beagle began writing the novel.
Mommy Fortuna is a wicked old witch, who uses her dark magic to run a sideshow carnival for profit. The carnival features what appear to be mythical creatures, but are actually just normal animals that have been enchanted, with the exception of the harpy, Celaeno.  According to Beagle, the name "Fortuna" was taken from the Roman goddess of fortune, and German mythical hero Fortunatus.
Schmendrick is a bumbling magician who travels with Mommy Fortuna's traveling carnival out of pure necessity.  Reduced to entertaining the sightseers who come to the carnival, Schmendrick wants nothing more than to become a true, powerful magician who does not rely on card tricks and cheap illusions.  He sees Mommy Fortuna as an opportunity to gain experience, but when he sees the captured Unicorn for what she is, he decides to free her and join her on her quest. Schmendrick was a character Beagle had initially made up for his children's bedtime stories, and was called "the world's worst magician". The name "Schmendrick the Magician" is a parody of the character "Mandrake the Magician", and is also drawn from a Yiddish word that Beagle defines as "somebody out of his depth, the boy sent to do a man's job, someone who has expanded to the limits of his incapacity."
Captain Cully is the leader of a second-rate band of outlaws in direct opposition to King Haggard. Although he attempts to be dashing and hospitable, Cully falls victim to his own jealousy of famous mythical outlaws such as Robin Hood, an illusion of whom Schmendrick inadvertently conjures. According to Beagle, Captain Cully's name is drawn from an old English slang word for "buddy".
Molly Grue is Captain Cully's common-law wife. As a young woman she had eloped with him, naively attracted to the romance of loving a woodland fugitive and sharing his life. Unfortunately, this turned into years of serving Cully's ragged vagrants as their camp cook. She seeks a different reality from the one fate decided for her, and when she discovers Schmendrick leaving with the unicorn, she decides to follow them and do whatever she can to help the unicorn in her quest. Molly Grue's name is drawn from a French word meaning "crane". While never initially making the connection, Beagle notes that it is possible that the name was also inspired by Molly Epstein, his "favorite writing teacher in high school".
The Red Bull is a magical creature, blind but powerful, which is sensitive to the presence of any unicorn and tries to intimidate it into submission, thence driving it into the sea. Neither the Red Bull's affiliation with King Haggard nor its pattern of behaviour is explained, but these both end when finally the Last Unicorn stands up to it.
King Haggard is a miserable and cruel King who cares for no one, not even his adopted son Prince Lír. His loneliness and misery is only alleviated by the sight of unicorns, and this drove him to capture all of them for his own pleasure. He commands the powerful Red Bull, who has driven all the unicorns into the sea underneath of his castle by his own decree. The name "Haggard" is based on the actual word. Beagle stated that "on the one hand, it is a particular look, but on the other it's also a falconer's term. It's what you call an undomesticated hawk, a bird that knows the rudiments but is not reliable. If you fly a haggard, you might never see it again, it might go back to the wild." He also went on to say that he has "never really been able to see [Haggard] as a villain", explaining that he saw much of his own character in Haggard to the point that he "felt sorry for him".
 Prince Lír is a skilled hero who was adopted by King Haggard, who found him in the town of Hagsgate. Despite living with Haggard, Prince Lír is the opposite of his adopted father, living his life with valor, honor, and compassion for others. He falls in love with Lady Amalthea, not realizing what she is until the very end. For all of her arrogance towards humankind, the Unicorn falls in love with Lír. Beagle stated that he "knew that the prince's name had to be one syllable", and that he made a long list of one-syllable names to choose from. He chose "Lír" because he liked the sound of it, but later on noted that he had borrowed the name of a Celtic sea god, Llyr, and that the fact that Lír became "King Lír" after succeeding his adoptive father "echoed Shakespeare".

Conception and creation
It took Beagle "close to two years" to write The Last Unicorn, and he states that "it was hard every step of the way". Beagle came up with the idea for the novel in 1962 while on an "artistic retreat" in Berkshire Hills after Viking Press rejected his novel The Mirror Kingdom. He stated that though the idea for the novel was "just suddenly there", he also said that he had "read tons of fantasy and mythology" from childhood, and that his mother told him that he had shared a story about unicorns during a visit to one of the elementary school classes she taught. He also mentioned that he loved the 1941 book The Colt from Moon Mountain by Dorothy P. Lathrop (a story about a unicorn in Kansas) as a child, and that Spanish artist Marcial Rodriguez had given him a painting of unicorns fighting bulls when he was seventeen. Once he had the idea, he did research on unicorns at the Pittsfield Library.

The 85-page manuscript that Beagle first wrote differs greatly from the current version of the book. Though the unicorn "is much the same", the story is set in modern times, and the unicorn is accompanied by a two-headed demon named Webster and Azazel. This original version was published as a limited edition hardcover by Subterranean Press titled The Last Unicorn: The Lost Version in 2006. Beagle stopped working on this initial manuscript in 1963, stating that "[i]t was a dead end", but picked the project up again in 1965.

Beagle dedicated the novel to Olfert Dapper, a reference to whom Beagle had come across during his research, as well as Robert Nathan, whose novel One More Spring influenced Beagle's A Fine and Private Place. In 2012, Beagle published a novelet, Olfert Dapper's Day, a fictional tale of Dapper's travels.

Publication history

In English
There have been many print editions of The Last Unicorn.

A corrected, definitive English-language text was prepared for the 2007 Deluxe Edition and used also in the trade paperback 40th Anniversary Edition (Roc Books, 2008). The Deluxe Edition was available for purchase only from Barnes & Noble, with co-publishers Roc imprint and Barnes & Noble (OCLC 243775547). Beside the corrected text of the novel it included an edition of the sequel and new material including cover illustration by the prominent fantasy and children's book illustrators Leo and Diane Dillon.

In July 2022, The book was re-published.

Audiobook
In 2004, Beagle recorded an unabridged audiobook of his novel for Conlan Press. The audiobook was sold in three formats with varying prices: as downloadable MP3 files (released in 2005), an MP3 CD, and as an eight-CD collector's set containing the audiobook on seven audio CDs and an exclusive interview with Beagle on the eighth.
Purchasers of this edition were to be sent a free autographed 3,000-copy limited hardcover edition of Two Hearts. Preorders began in late 2004; as of August 2009, the book and CDs were finished but not yet manufactured.

In July 2022, The Last Unicorn was released on Audible and was narrated by Orlagh Cassidy.

Sequels and related works

Beagle published a coda story to The Last Unicorn titled "Two Hearts" in the October/November 2005 issue of Fantasy and Science Fiction magazine.  Though beginning with a new narrator, four main characters from the original story appear again.  The story is also included in the short story anthology The Line Between, published in July 2006, as well as in the deluxe edition of The Last Unicorn that was published in 2007. Two Hearts won the annual Hugo and Nebula Awards as the year's best novelette.

At the end of December 2008, Peter S. Beagle announced that he had written several new stories which were directly or indirectly linked to The Last Unicorn. These included three unicorn stories ("The Story of Kao Yu" about a Chinese ki-lin, "My Son Heydari and the Karkadann", and "Olfert Dapper's Day", a fictional account of the Dutch physician and writer's encounter with a unicorn in the Maine woods) and two Schmendrick stories ("The Green-Eyed Boy" and "Schmendrick Alone"). In 2017, these stories were gathered in a short story collection titled The Overneath. "The Green-Eyed Boy", which earlier appeared in the September/October 2016 issue of Fantasy and Science Fiction magazine, describes the early days of Schmendrick's apprenticeship under Nikos. A third completed Schmendrick story was also mentioned by Beagle in December 2008.

IDW Publishing published a six-issue comic book adaptation of The Last Unicorn beginning April 2010. It will be followed by an adaptation of A Fine and Private Place.

The short story collection Sleight of Hand from 2011 contains a Schmendrick story titled "The Woman Who Married the Man in the Moon", and "Oakland Dragon Blues", a story concerning the fate of the dragon from Beagle's abandoned early version of The Last Unicorn (circa 1962).

2017 saw the publication of a novella titled In Calabria, in which the appearance of a unicorn on a quiet Italian farm leads to upheaval, violence and death.

Adaptations

Rankin/Bass

In 1982 the novel was made into an animated film of the same name directed and produced by Rankin/Bass for ITC Entertainment, with a screenplay written by Beagle himself and animated by Topcraft (predecessor of Studio Ghibli).  The music was composed and written by Jimmy Webb and performed by America.  The voice actors include Christopher Lee, Angela Lansbury, Alan Arkin, Jeff Bridges, and Mia Farrow. The first DVD release of the film by Lionsgate was of poor quality, but a "25th Anniversary Edition" DVD with superior quality was released in February 2007.

Continent Films
In addition, a live-action adaptation of the original book has been announced as in development for several years, but it is not clear what progress (if any) has been made towards production.

In February 2006, Continent Films unveiled a new official website for the project which made clear that the film was still in development. It was not yet funded, did not have a shooting script, and had not been cast. In the new website, all actor names but Christopher Lee's had been removed; and even Lee's involvement was revealed to be nothing more than a promise to appear in the film if he was available and if terms could be worked out with his agent. Lee passed away in 2015 and the website was changed in April 2016 to promote the 2015 film, Angels in Notting Hill, which was Lee's final appearance on screen. The website was changed back in August to The Last Unicorn and, as of January 2022, bears only a background picture and the words "The Last Unicorn" and "This website is currently not in service".

Stage adaptation
In 1988, a stage adaptation of the novel was presented by the Intiman Playhouse in Seattle. Peter S. Beagle wrote the script, which was a musical presented in collaboration with Pacific Northwest Ballet. The production was directed by Elizabeth Huddle.

In fall 2009, a new stage adaptation was presented in Chicago by Promethean Theatre Ensemble.

Reception
Cliff Ramshaw reviewed The Last Unicorn for Arcane magazine, rating it a 10 out of 10 overall. Ramshaw comments that "this latest edition gives a new generation of readers the chance to let a little beauty into their lives. Don't miss it."

Reviews
Review by Fred Patten (April 1, 1968) in Shangri L'Affaires #72
Review by M. John Harrison (December 1968) in New Worlds,
Review by Alexei Panshin (April 1969) in Fantastic
Review by Gahan Wilson (October 1969) in The Magazine of Fantasy and Science Fiction
Review by John Brunner (Autumn 1969) in Vector #54
Review by Spider Robinson (June 1977) in Galaxy
Review by Baird Searles (May 1979) in Isaac Asimov's Science Fiction Magazine
Review by Peter Bernhardt (March 1988) in Riverside Quarterly
Review by David Pringle (1988) in Modern Fantasy: The Hundred Best Novels
Review by John C. Bunnell (May 1991) in Dragon Magazine
Review by Jacek Dukaj (1995) in Nowa Fantastyka, #158 Listopad
Review by Charles de Lint (June 2007) in The Magazine of Fantasy & Science Fiction
Review by Sara Polsky (February 16, 2009) in Strange Horizons
Review by Stephen E. Andrews and Nick Rennison (2009) in 100 Must-Read Fantasy Novels
Review by Bill Fawcett and Jody Lynn Nye (September 2017) in Galaxy's Edge, Issue 28

References

Citations

Further reading
 Lin Carter. Imaginary Worlds: The Art of Fantasy NY: Ballantine, 1973, pp160–63.

External links

1968 American novels
1968 fantasy novels
American fantasy novels adapted into films
American novels adapted into plays
Fiction about unicorns
High fantasy novels
Viking Press books
Unicorns